Tent Show Records is Murder by Death's record label in the EastWest family of labels.

See also 
 List of record labels

External links
 Official site

American record labels
Vanity record labels